Hirschbach is a municipality in the district of Amberg-Sulzbach in Bavaria in Germany.

Prototype grandstand in Achtel 
The small village of Achtel in Hirschbach is the site of a disused sports grandstand constructed as a prototype for part of the planned Deutsches Stadion in Nuremberg, which Hitler had planned as to be used as a venue for all Olympic Games subsequent to a Nazi victory in World War II. It is now in a state of disrepair.

References

Amberg-Sulzbach